Waitakere City F.C. was a New Zealand football club. They merged with Norwest United in 2021 to form West Coast Rangers. They last competed in the Lotto Sport Italia NRFL Premier League.

History
It was formed in 1989 with the purpose of representing West Auckland in the National Soccer League. At first the club was located in Western Springs, but following a merger with Massey AFC in 1991, it moved to its current location, at Fred Taylor Park in Whenuapai, West Auckland.

Waitakere City F.C. quickly established itself as one of New Zealand's top clubs, winning the national championship on five occasions (1990, 1992, 1995, 1996 and 1997) and finishing as the runner-up once (1993). They also have three Chatham Cup wins to their name (1994, 1995 and 1996) and they finished as runners-up four times (1999, 2004, 2013 and 2016).

Honours

New Zealand National Soccer League
Champions (5): 1990, 1992, 1995, 1996, 1997

 Lotto Sport Italia NRFL Division 1
Champions (1): 2016

Chatham Cup
Champions (3): 1994, 1995, 1996

External links
Club website
The Ultimate New Zealand Soccer Website
US1 Waitakere City page

Association football clubs in Auckland
Association football clubs established in 1989
1989 establishments in New Zealand